"Kids of the Century" is a song and single by the German power metal band Helloween taken from the album Pink Bubbles Go Ape. This is the first Helloween single with Roland Grapow playing guitars, replacing Kai Hansen.

They made a promo video at the Rainbow Theatre in London, directed by Storm Thorgerson, who also made the front cover of the album and the single.

It is also the first Helloween recording with a song written by bassist Markus Grosskopf: "Shit and Lobster". The Japanese version of the single contains an exclusive Helloween interview (6:02) instead of "Shit and Lobster".

Single track listing

Personnel
Michael Kiske - vocals
Roland Grapow - lead and rhythm guitars
Michael Weikath - lead and rhythm guitars
Markus Grosskopf - bass guitar
Ingo Schwichtenberg - drums

Charts

References

1991 singles
Helloween songs
Songs written by Michael Kiske